Deep Memorial Public School, situated at A-Block, Ramprastha, Ghaziabad, Uttar Pradesh, India and affiliated to the Central Board of Secondary Education (CBSE), was established in 1988. The school is dedicated to the memory of Ch. Deep Chand Ji. It was formally inaugurated by Sh. Moti Lal Vohra, ex-governor of Uttar Pradesh. The school has boarding facilities and accepts students from all over India.

The motto of the school is "Work is Worship." A separate Junior branch was set up at D-Block, Ramprastha, Ghaziabad and was formally inaugurated by Governor of Uttar Pradesh Vishnu Kant Shastri.

Activities

Students join one of four houses, named Himadri, Shivalik, Aravali,  and Vindhya house after mountain ranges. Competitive events ranging from sports to quizzing are held throughout the year to decide for the best house of the academic year. It also takes children to trips across India every year.

References

1988 establishments in Uttar Pradesh
Educational institutions established in 1988
High schools and secondary schools in Uttar Pradesh
Schools in Ghaziabad, Uttar Pradesh